"Disneyland After Dark" is an episode of Walt Disney's Wonderful World of Color that aired on April 15, 1962. Later, it was released theatrically overseas as a short subject.

As the name of the episode implies, Walt Disney himself presents a view of Disneyland at night. It features some nighttime entertainment, including a fireworks display (complete with Tinker Bell flying across the sky) and Tahitian dancers performing for Adventureland dinner patrons. However, this episode focuses less on Disneyland itself and more on the many celebrity singers at the different sections of the park, including the Osmond Brothers, former Mouseketeers Annette Funicello and Bobby Burgess, teen heartthrob Bobby Rydell, Monette Moore, and Louis Armstrong. In a running gag, Walt Disney introduces but is unable to attend these attractions and performances, being pinned down by an endless supply of autograph seekers (including a repeat customer) throughout the program.

Home media
The short was released on December 4, 2001, on Walt Disney Treasures: Disneyland, USA and presented in its original, uncut NBC broadcast presentation.

References

External links 
 

Walt Disney anthology television series episodes
Disneyland
1962 American television episodes
Television episodes directed by Hamilton Luske